Norcodeine is an opiate analogue that is the N-demethylated derivative of codeine. It has relatively little opioid activity in its own right, but is formed as a metabolite of codeine following ingestion.

Norcodeine is a Schedule I Narcotic controlled substance in the US with the ACSCN of 9309 and zero annual manufacturing quota.  The salts in use are the acetate (free base conversion ratio 0.826), hydroiodide (0.662), hydrochloride (0.759), nitrate (0.819), platinichloride (0.582), and sulphate (0.744).

See also 
 Nalodeine

References 

4,5-Epoxymorphinans
Phenol ethers
Secondary alcohols
Opiates
Opioid metabolites